Ziyadat Allah can refer to:

 Ziyadat Allah I of Ifriqiya, third Aghlabid emir of Ifriqiya (817–838)
 Ziyadat Allah II of Ifriqiya, seventh Aghlabid emir of Ifriqiya (863–864)
 Ziyadat Allah III of Ifriqiya, eleventh and last Aghlabid emir of Ifriqiya (903–909)